Richard Overton may refer to:
Richard Overton (Leveller) (fl. 1640–1664), pamphlet writer and member of the Leveller movement during the English Civil War
Richard Overton (sound engineer), American film sound technician
Richard Arvin Overton (1906–2018), American soldier, who was the oldest living veteran of World War II and oldest man in the USA at the time of his death. 
Richard C. Overton (1907–1988), American railroad historian
Rick Overton (born 1954), American screenwriter, actor and comedian